Tara is a rural town and locality in the Western Downs Region, Queensland, Australia.

Geography 
Tara is on the Darling Downs. The town is at the centre of the locality. Immediately surrounding the urban area of Tara, there are a number of rural subdivisions of 'lifestyle blocks'. The blocks are usually between 13 and 40 ha in area. The population of the 2000 Rural Subdivision blocks exceeds that of the town itself.

The Glenmorgan railway line traverses the locality from east (Goranba) to west (The Gums). There are two railway stations within the locality:

 Tara railway station, serving the town
 Tullagrie railway station, to the south-west of the town but now abandoned

History
Baranggum (also known as Barrunggam, Barunggam Parrungoom, Murrumgama) is an Australian Aboriginal language spoken by the Baranggum people. The Baranggum language region includes the landscape within the local government boundaries of the Western Downs Regional Council, particularly Dalby, Tara, Jandowae and west towards Chinchilla.

The town was surveyed in May 1910 by Leonard Shield. The name Tara was used as the name for a pastoral run on 25 March 1852. It is assumed that it is a reference to the Hill of Tara in County Meath, Ireland.

Tara Provisional School opened on 23 January 1911 but was renamed Laurndel Provisional School in 1912. In 1915 it was renamed Burrowes Provisional School. In 1923 it became Burrowes State School. It closed in 1946.

Tara State School opened on 21 August 1912. On 28 November 2004, it was renamed Tara Shire State College. It celebrated its centenary in 2012.

Myra Provisional School opened in 1911 and closed circa 1929. It reopened circa 1944 and closed circa 1945.

In 1914, a Methodist Church was built in Tara.

St Joseph's Catholic Primary School was established in 1965 by the Sisters of St Joseph of the Sacred Heart.  From 1978, the school has had a lay principal.

Tara Library opened in 1987 and had a major refurbishment in 2009.

On 14 March 2011 a blockade against coal seam gas development began at a property called Kenya near Tara.  The following day a woman was arrested after she stopped the movement of a bulldozer working for Queensland Gas Company. The next month Bob Irwin was arrested and fined for participating in a rally at the same location. He was protesting against plans to build a coal seam gas pipeline. Local landowner Dayne Pratzky, now an anti-coal seam gas activist, features in the 2015 movie-length documentary Frackman.

On 12 December 2022, Constables Matthew Arnold and Rachel McCrow were murdered at the nearby locality of Wieambilla. The two constables were based at Tara Police Station at the time of the incident.

Demographics

Economy 
Important industries in the area around Tara include wheat, beef, wool and gas.

Education 
St Joseph's School is a Catholic primary (Prep-6) school for boys and girls at 3 Fry Street. In 2017, the school had an enrolment of 26 students with 5 teachers (4 full-time equivalent) and 4 non-teaching staff (2 full-time equivalent). In 2018, the school had an enrolment of 23 students with 5 teachers (4 full-time equivalent) and 4 non-teaching staff (2 full-time equivalent).

Tara Shire State College is a government primary and secondary (Early Childhood-12) school for boys and girls at 22 Binnie Street. In 2017, the school had an enrolment of 359 students with 37 teachers (36 full-time equivalent) and 30 non-teaching staff (23 full-time equivalent).  In 2018, the school had an enrolment of 354 students with 39 teachers (38 full-time equivalent) and 28 non-teaching staff (22 full-time equivalent). The school includes a special education program.

Amenities 
Tara has a library at 31 Day Street operated by the Western Downs Regional Council.

Attractions 
Attractions near Tara include Southwood National Park, a remnant area of the southern brigalow belt.

The Commercial Hotel has two murals painted by artist Hugh Sawrey, from nearby Kogan. Painted in 1960, they are You’ll come a waltzing Matilda with me and Clancy’s gone to Queensland droving.

Coal seam gas controversy 
After the establishment of the Surat Basin Coal Seam Gas (CSG) development in 2011, a number of residents of Tara reported unusual health conditions which they believed to be related to the CSG development. While initially Queensland Health reported that living conditions were the likely cause, many of the reported symptoms (particularly in children) corresponded with typical symptoms of hydrocarbon exposure.  Independent water analysis of private dam water has also shown excessive levels of lead and hydrocarbons, however a causal link between water analysis results and CSG activities appears to be a matter of ongoing debate.  

In 2013, the Queensland Government conducted an inquiry into Coal Seam Gas in the Tara Region and a risk assessment on the health and environmental impacts, concluding that "a clear link can not
be drawn between the health complaints by some residents in the Tara region and impacts of the local CSG industry on air, water or soil within the community."  

In 2016, the Australian Government conducted a senate inquiry into unconventional mining.  Many residents of Tara made submissions to this inquiry.  Some residents have accused the state and federal government of attempting to brush these reports under the rug, and providing inadequate resources for testing in order to promote a pro-mining agenda.  

Lock the Gate Alliance continue to lobby against coal seam gas in the area, and have produced a set of first-hand accounts in short film format called Voices from the Gaslands to highlight the ongoing struggles for the community.

See also

 Energy in Queensland

References

Further reading
 A History of Tara and District with Addenda 1840-1960 by Hector M Ferguson.	
 Tara Shire History 1840-1988 by Tara & Districts Historical Society.

External links

 

 Town map of Tara, 1986
TravelMate article
Surat Basin Corporation article on Tara

Towns in Queensland
Towns in the Darling Downs
Western Downs Region
Localities in Queensland